Luník IX is a borough (city ward) in the city of Košice, Slovakia, in the Košice II district. It is located in the western-central part of the city, surrounded by the boroughs of Pereš, Myslava, Barca, Juh and Západ.

Characteristics

Luník IX houses one of the largest communities of Romani people in Slovakia. Although originally built for 2,500 inhabitants, it is estimated that the population is now three times larger. Living standards are low, with services such as gas, water, and electricity cut off, as the majority of inhabitants are not paying rent or utilities fees and the utilities infrastructure has been ransacked to sell for scrap.

Health standards are low, and diseases such as hepatitis, head lice, diarrhea, scabies and meningitis are common. Unemployment in the borough reaches almost 100 percent. It has one elementary school and a kindergarten.

Luník IX is serviced by a bus line, which stops only on selected bus stops. Boarding the bus is only allowed through the front door. Due to frequent attacks of aggressive residents, bus drivers deployed on the line receive a hazard pay.

History
The Romani village close to the borough was demolished in 1979 and the Romani people were moved into Luník IX; in addition, there was a landfill nearby. As early as in the 1980s the Romani comprised half of the population, which was around 2,000. Over time, the non-Romani population gradually moved away, with the Romani taking flats after their departure, and the borough turned into a Romani ghetto.

In 1995, the city council of Košice created a plan for the living conditions of dodgers, the maladjusted, and people from illegally occupied flats around Košice. They were to be moved into Luník IX, with "non-problematic" families being gradually moved out if they requested it. The realization of this plan is on-going.

In September 2021, Pope Francis visited the settlement and delivered an address to the inhabitants during his first papal trip to Slovakia.

Statistics
 Area: 
 Population: 6,411 (December 2017)
 Density of population: 6,000/km² (December 2017)
 District: Košice II
 Mayor: Marcel Šaňa (as of 2018 elections)

Gallery

References

External links

 Official website of the Luník IX borough
 Article on the Luník IX borough at Cassovia.sk
 Official website of Košice

Boroughs of Košice
Romani-related controversies
Romani communities in Slovakia